is a Japanese manga series written and illustrated by Namori. The series began serialization in Ichijinsha's Comic Yuri Hime S magazine from June 12, 2008, before being moved over to Comic Yuri Hime in September 2010. An anime adaptation by Doga Kobo aired in Japan between July and September 2011, with a second season airing between July and September 2012. An original video animation by TYO Animations was released on February 18, 2015, followed by two TV specials which aired in August and September 2015. A third TV season by TYO Animations aired between October and December 2015. Another OVA by Lay-duce, announced to celebrate the manga's tenth anniversary, was released on November 13, 2019, and was televised on AT-X on February 23, 2020.  A spin-off original net animation titled Miniyuri by DMM.futureworks and W-Toon Studio premiered on YouTube on September 25, 2019.  A spin-off web manga, began release on Nico Nico Seiga in July 2012.

Plot 

Characters

The Amusement Club
 

Akari is a polite, fun-loving, and benevolent red-haired girl who is said to be the main protagonist of the series but often pales in comparison to the other characters, and gets severely out-of-focus. She is well-known for her trademark hair buns and her lack of presence, both of which are comically bantered by the other characters.
 

An optimistic and energetic blonde girl who is a year older than Akari and is the more substantial main protagonist. Not one to pass up an opportunity for a laugh, she is often causing Yui trouble and crushing on Chinatsu, who resembles her favorite anime character, Mirakurun. She's the object of affection of student council vice-president Ayano, who is in many ways her opposite. Despite her lazy attitude, she often gets high scores in tests after cram sessions. She enjoys eating rum raisin ice cream and is also a talented dōjin artist.
 

A cool-headed girl with dark hair who often acts as the voice of reason, Yui is the childhood friend of Akari and Kyōko. She enjoys video games and is shown to be a good cook, leaving Chinatsu obsessed with her food. She is a reliable friend and lives alone in an apartment complex, and although she won't admit it, she tends to feel lonely when others, particularly Kyōko, aren't around. Although generally quiet, she will sometimes burst into stifled laughter upon hearing Ayano's puns.
 

Akari's pink-haired classmate who originally wanted to join the Tea Ceremony Club, but ended up in the Amusement Club as said club was already abolished. She is often chased after by Kyōko due to her resemblance to the anime character Mirakurun, though she herself has a passionate crush on Yui, whom she often fantasizes about. While generally cute, benevolent and overly happy, especially in the presence of Yui, she tends to be selfish and occasionally shows dark thoughts. She also has a terrifying lack of artistic skills, frequently leaving others in shock.

Student Council
 

Ayano is the uptight and high-strung Student Council vice-president who is often not too honest with her feelings for Kyōko, always referring to her by her full name and treating her with acts of hostility, despite not wanting do so on purpose. As a diligent student, she constantly sees herself as a rival to Kyōko, who always manages to beat her in tests. However, on the inside, she is romantic and affectionate towards Kyōko, though she doesn't always show her friendly and responsive side, seeing it as a weakness. Though she may not outwardly show it, she cares about the people around her and sometimes doesn't think of herself, sacrificing her time and energy for the sake of others. She also frequently makes puns and likes crème caramels.
 

A member of Student Council who is almost always seen with Ayano. Though she has a gentle disposition, she is a yuri fangirl and has various fantasies of them whenever she takes her glasses off, almost always pairing Kyōko together with Ayano, which often leads to near-fatal nosebleeds. She speaks in soft Kansai dialect and likes tsukemono. Whenever she gets drunk (or eats chocolate in the anime), she goes on a kissing rampage.
 

An enthusiastic candidate for the Student Council vice-president next year. She has dark blond hair and a petite build, which she has a complex about. She and Himawari are childhood friends and rivals, constantly fighting as they both aim to become vice-president, though they do seem to hold feelings for each other. She is also quite friendly towards Akari. She and Kyōko are quite similar, but she appears to be much more prone to tantrums and lazier when it comes to school work.
 

Another candidate for the Student Council vice-president next year. She has navy blue hair and large boobs, which often leads to her being teased by Sakurako, who is jealous of her early physical development. She generally behaves in graceful manner and speech toward everyone but Sakurako. Despite this, she does appear to hold feelings for her and often helps her with her homework.
 

The current student council president who has very little presence and often speaks in a whisper-quiet voice that only a few people such as Nana can understand. She is Nana's "Explosive Friend," because she always suffers the explosions she causes.

Family members
 

A daughter of one of Yui's relatives. She is a fan of Mirakurun, and initially mistakes Chinatsu for her, though does not take kindly to Chinatsu after learning her personality doesn't match her image.
 

Himawari's six year old sister. Kaede is shown to be quite even-tempered and wise beyond her years.
 

Chitose's twin sister, who looks identical to her except for eye color. Unlike her sister, Chizuru is shown to be very cold and distant towards most people, though she has a strong bond with her sibling. Much like Chitose, she often takes off her glasses to invoke yuri fantasies, pairing Ayano with Chitose and drooling instead of having nosebleeds. She strongly dislikes Kyōko, who constantly tries to play pranks on her and is seemingly a barrier against her fantasies.
 

Akari's older sister who is 19 years old and attends a university. She is secretly infatuated with Akari, with her room almost completely covered in photos of her, often doing various perverted things with her belongings when she is not around and reading many doujins about sisterly incest.
 

Chinatsu's older sister. She's a friend of Akane and has strong feelings for her.
 

Sakurako's older sister who is eighteen years old. Like Sakurako, she also has a petite build, but she is also taller, and unlike Sakurako, she is intelligent and responsible. She is in a romantic relationship with one of her friends, though it has not yet been revealed who.
 

Sakurako's younger sister who is an elementary school student, and is eight years old. She acts very mature for her age, but also has some childish tendencies. Both Hanako and Nadeshiko tend to think Sakurako is lazy, abrasive and stupid, though they are shown to miss her when she's not around.

Others
 

A faculty member at Nanamori Middle School who is constantly trying various experiments, often using Rise as a test subject and has a love for explosions, which are generally caused by her experiments. She is one of the few people who can understand Rise's quiet voice.
 

Akari and Chinatsu's classmate, who is an admirer of Kyōko's doujin works and is the heroine of Namori's other manga, Reset!.
 
She is Akari and Chinatsu's classmate, who is trying to find a way to make money. She is the secondary protagonist of the YuruYuri spin-off Reset! and Hiro Takaoka's best friend.
 
Nadeshiko's classmate.
 
Nadeshiko's classmate.
 
Nadeshiko's classmate.
 
Hanako's classmate.
 
Hanako's classmate.
 
Hanako's classmate, who sees her as a rival.

An art teacher at Nanamori Middle School and a close friend of Nana Nishigaki. She has known Nana since high school and wishes to draw her.

A P.E. teacher at Nanamori Middle School.

Mirakurun
  

The heroine of the fictional magical girl series, "Majokko Mirakurun". When transformed, she greatly resembles Chinatsu. She attacks by turning her magic wand to a blunt weapon and beat them.
  

Another magical girl who competes with Mirakurun. She is secretly Kurumi's classmate.
 

A spherical robot who is Rivalun's boss with a pair of sunglasses. There were a pair of eyes with style with style of shoujo manga under the sunglasses. The only character with a male voice.

Books and publications 

YuruYuri began its serial run in Ichijinsha's Japanese manga magazine Comic Yuri Hime S on June 18, 2008. In September 2010, YuruYuri was moved to Comic Yuri Hime when Comic Yuri Hime S ended its publication. The series went on indefinite hiatus starting on July 18, 2018, but resumed publication in January 2019. As of December 2011, over a million copies of the manga have been sold. The manga was briefly released in English on the online reader site JManga before it shut down.

Another manga series set in the same universe, began serialization in Caramel Febri magazine's first issue, released on July 24, 2010, and went on hiatus after the fourth issue, on January 25, 2011.

A spin-off web manga by Namori focusing on the Ohmuro sisters, titled , has been released on Niconico's Niconico Seiga service. The series first released chapters alongside episodes of the second anime season between July 2, 2012, and September 17, 2012, before resuming on Ichijinsha's Niconico Yuri Hime web manga publication from February 17, 2013. An isekai spinoff manga series titled , a parody of the That Time I Got Reincarnated as a Slime light novel, was teased as an April Fools' joke on April 1, 2020, before being officially announced on April 17, 2020. The series will be drawn by Naya Minadori and released on Kodansha's Suiyōbi no Sirius section of Niconico Seiga. A prequel spin-off by Namori centering around the teachers featured in the main series, titled  began release from July 31, 2020.

Volume list

Original series

Special edition

Ohmuroke

Anime 

An anime television adaptation of the manga series was announced in the May 2011 issue of Comic Yuri Hime. Animated by Doga Kobo and directed by Masahiko Ohta, the series aired in Japan on TV Tokyo between July 5 and September 20, 2011.

A second season, titled YuruYuri♪♪, aired in Japan between July 2, 2012, and September 17, 2012. Both series were simulcast by Crunchyroll. The series won the Television award at the 17th Animation Kobe Awards. NIS America have licensed both seasons in North America, releasing the first two seasons subtitled Blu-ray Disc on September 3, 2013, and January 7, 2014, respectively. Later NIS America released on Blu-ray and DVD on January 7, 2014.

An original video animation titled  was screened in five theaters in Japan on November 29, 2014 before being released on Blu-ray and DVD on February 18, 2015. Unlike the series, the OVA is animated by TYO Animations instead of Doga Kobo, with Hiroyuki Hata replacing Ohta as director, Michiko Yokote replacing Takashi Aoshima as scriptwriter, and Motohiro Tanaguchi replacing character designer Chiaki Nakajima and serving as chief animation designer. Two additional episodes, titled Nachuyachumi!+, aired on August 21 and September 18, 2015.

A third anime season, titled YuruYuri San☆Hai!, also produced by TYO Animations, aired in Japan between October 6, 2015, and December 21, 2015. Like the previous two seasons, it was simulcast by Crunchyroll.

A new OVA, titled YuruYuri, (pronounced "YuruYuri Ten"), was announced on April 22, 2018, to celebrate the manga's tenth anniversary. The OVA is animated by Lay-duce instead of TYO Animations, with Daigo Yamagishi as director, Takahiro as scriptwriter, and Kazutoshi Inoue serving as character designer and chief animation designer. The new OVA was crowdfunded and completed its goal in February 2019. It was released on November 13, 2019 and had its television premiere on AT-X on February 23, 2020

A four-episode original net animation series produced by DMM.Futureworks and W-Toon Studio, titled MiniYuri, began streaming on Pony Canyon's YouTube channel from September 25, 2019.  The series is directed by Seiya Miyajima, with Takahiro as scriptwriter, and Yasuhiro Misawa composing the music.

Music

Appearances in other media
Characters and songs from YuruYuri appeared alongside other anime characters in the rhythm game, Miracle Girls Festival, which was developed by Sega for the PlayStation Vita, and was released on December 17, 2015. The series also had a collaboration with Release the Spyce: Secret Fragrance, a mobile game based on the anime series Release the Spyce that Namori had a hand in creating.

References

External links
  
  
 

2008 manga
2011 anime television series debuts
2012 anime television series debuts
2012 manga
2015 anime television series debuts
Comedy anime and manga
Doga Kobo
Ichijinsha manga
Japanese LGBT-related animated television series
Lay-duce
Manga series
School life in anime and manga
Slice of life anime and manga
TV Tokyo original programming
AT-X (TV network) original programming
Yonkoma
Yumeta Company
Yuri (genre) anime and manga